Bairro Peixoto is a region in Rio de Janeiro, Brazil but it is not officially recognized as a neighborhood. Officially, it forms part of the neighborhood of Copacabana, but has distinct characteristics.

Geography of Rio de Janeiro (city)